The 2011–12 Liga Profesional de Primera División season, also known as the 2011–12 Copa Uruguaya or the 2011–12 Campeonato Uruguayo, was the 108th season of Uruguay's top-flight football league, and the 81st in which it was professional. Nacional was the defending champion.

Teams
Sixteen teams competed in the Primera División this season. Thirteen teams remained from the 2010–11 season. Miramar Misiones, Tacuarembó, and Central Español were relegated after accumulating the fewest points in the relegation table. They were replaced by Rentistas, Cerrito, and Cerro Largo, the 2010–11 Segunda División winner, runner-up, and playoff winner, respectively. All of the new teams are making repeat appearances. All the teams in this season are from Montevideo, except Cerro Largo, who is from Melo.

Personnel and kits

Note: Flags indicate national team as has been defined under FIFA eligibility rules. Players may hold more than one non-FIFA nationality.

 1 According to current revision League managers

Managerial changes

Torneo Apertura
The Torneo Apertura "Juan José Tudurí" was the first tournament of the season. It began on August 13, 2011.

Standings

Results

Top goalscorers

Updated as of games played on  December 4, 2011.Source:

Torneo Clausura

The Torneo Clausura is the second tournament of the season. It runs from 2/18/2012 to 05/26/12.

Standings

Results

Top goalscorers

Updated as of games played on  June 2, 2012.Source:

Aggregate table

Top goalscorers

Updated as of games played on  May 27, 2012.Source:

Hat-tricks

 4 Player scored 4 goals

Relegation

Championship playoff
Nacional and Defensor Sporting qualified to the championship playoffs as the Apertura and Clausura winners, respectively. Additionally, Nacional re-qualified as the team with the most points in the season aggregate table. Given this situation, an initial playoff was held between the two teams. Nacional would become the season champion with a win; Defensor Sporting needed to win the playoff to force a two-legged final.

Semi-final

References

External links
Asociación Uruguaya de Fútbol 
Tournament regulations 

2011-12
1
2011 in South American football leagues
2012 in South American football leagues